Following is a list of destinations currently served by Austral Líneas Aéreas, . The list also includes the airports that serve either as a hub or as a focus city for the carrier. Terminated destinations are additionally presented.

List

See also 

Transport in Argentina

References

External links 
 

Lists of airline destinations
Aerolíneas Argentinas